The IPSC French Handgun Championship is an IPSC level 3 championship held once a year by the French Shooting Federation.

Champions 
The following is a list of current and previous champions.

Overall category

Lady category

Junior category

Senior category

Super Senior category

See also 
IPSC French Rifle Championship
IPSC French Shotgun Championship

References 

Match Results  - 2007 IPSC French Handgun Championship
Match Results  - 2008 IPSC French Handgun Championship
Match Results  - 2012 IPSC French Handgun Championship
Match Results  - 2014 IPSC French Handgun Championship
Match Results  - 2015 IPSC French Handgun Championship
Match Results  - 2016 IPSC French Handgun Championship

IPSC shooting competitions
National shooting championships
France sport-related lists
Shooting competitions in France